Alasgarov (masculine) or Alasgarova (feminine), also transliterated as Aleskerov, is an Azerbaijani surname. Notable people with the surname include:

Abbas Alasgarov (1937–2018), Azerbaijani engineer and politician
Murtuz Alasgarov (1928–2012), Azerbaijani politician
Shamama Alasgarova (1904–1977), Azerbaijani physician

Azerbaijani-language surnames